HSwMS Hajen (Hj), (Swedish for "Shark") was the lead boat of the Hajen-class submarine of the Swedish Navy.

Construction and career 
HSwMS Hajen was launched on 11 December 1954 by Saab Kockums, Malmö and commissioned on 28 February 1957.

She was decommissioned on 1 July 1980 and later scrapped in Landskrona in 1983.

Gallery

References 

Hajen-class submarines
Ships built in Malmö
1954 ships